Al-Dir'iyyah Governorate is a governorate (muhafzah) within Riyadh Region in Saudi Arabia.  The governorate is bounded by the Saudi capital city of Riyadh to the south and east, by Dharma Governorate to the south and west, and by Huraymila Governorate to the north.  The governorate is seated in the city of al-Dir'iyyah, the original hometown of the House of Saud, which served as the capital of the Saudi dynasty from 1744 to 1818.  The population of the governorate was 60,777 at the time of the 2004 census, including 18,040 non-Saudis. 34,117 live in the city of al-Dir'iyyah itself.

Several towns and villages are included within the governorate, most of which are situated along the valley known as Wadi Hanifa or its tributaries. These include al-'Ammariyyah, al-Uyaynah, al-Jubaylah, and  Sadus.

The area contains several historic sites.  These include the ruins of the old city of al-Dir'iyah, which was destroyed by Ottoman-Egyptian forces in 1818, and a graveyard for the Muslim warriors who conquered the area from Musaylimah in the Ridda Wars shortly after the death of Prophet Muhammad. The governorate also houses the Saudi army's King Abdul Aziz Military College at al-Uyaynah.

Governorates of Saudi Arabia
Riyadh Province